Roger Barton may refer to:

 Roger Barton (film editor) (born 1965), American film editor
 Roger Barton (footballer) (1946–2013), English footballer
 Roger Barton (politician) (born 1945), British engineer and politician
 Roger Barton (rugby union) (1876–1949), rugby union player who represented Australia